Großgmain is a municipality in the district of Salzburg-Umgebung in the state of Salzburg in Austria.

Geography
Großgmain lies in the Salzburg Flachgau region in the northern foothills of the Untersberg massif, directly on the border with Bayerisch Gmain in the German state of Bavaria. The Austrian-German border runs along the Weißbach creek, a tributary of the Saalach river.

History

The Gmain area, first mentioned in a 712 deed of donation issued by Duke Theodbert of Bavaria, is an old settlement ground, a fertile plain stretching along the northern rim of the Berchtesgaden Alps. Archaeological findings date back to the Bronze Age; in the Middle Ages it became the centre of the dominions held by the Bavarian Counts of Plain, who had the Plainburg erected as their residence.

When the Archbishops of Salzburg achieved the status of Prince-bishops, the Weißbach became the western border of the immediate estates in the region. Though the villages of Großgmain und Bayerisch Gmain were part of different dominions, the sense of a common bond among the local population was preserved up to today.

Politics
Seats in the municipal assembly (Gemeinderat) as of 2014 local elections:
Austrian People's Party (ÖVP): 10
Social Democratic Party of Austria (SPÖ): 3
Freedom Party of Austria (FPÖ): 3
The Greens – The Green Alternative: 3

Notable people
Cesar Bresgen (1913–1988), composer, lived in Großgmain from 1956
Josef Meinrad (1913–1996), actor, died in Großgmain
Ilse Aichinger (born 1921), writer, lived in Großgmain from 1963 to 1981
Lolita (1931–2010), singer, lived in Großgmain until her death.

References

Cities and towns in Salzburg-Umgebung District
Austria–Germany border crossings